Vangelis Pourliotopoulos (born 13 April 1969) is a retired Greek goalkeeper who played in the 1990s and 2000s. He played in Superleague Greece for PAOK,  Ionikos, Panionios and Aris. He had more than 180 appearances in the first division.

Career
Pourliotopoulos was born in Thessaloniki. He started his career in the amateur club Panorama Thessaloniki. He moved to PAOK in 1992, where he played for the next five years. In 1997, he went to Ionikos, and two years later he moved to Panionios.  In 2001, while he was playing in Panionios, he won the best goalkeeper award from PSAP. In summer of 2001 he returned to PAOK and played there for the next three years. The last station of his career was for Aris, in which he played during the 2004–05 season.

Statistics by season

Honours
PAOK
Greek Cup: 1 (2003)

Aris
Greek Cup: Runner up (2005)

Individual
Best goalkeeper award by PSAP: 2001

References

External links
archive.sport.gr Βαγγέλης Πουρλιοτόπουλος

PAOK FC players
Panionios F.C. players
Aris Thessaloniki F.C. players
Super League Greece players
Greek footballers
1969 births
PAOK FC non-playing staff
Living people
Association football goalkeepers
Footballers from Thessaloniki